Frances "Bunty" Stephens (married name Frances Stephens Smith or Frances Smith Stephens; 26 July 1924 – 23 July 1978) was an English amateur golfer.

Personal life
Stephens was born in Lancashire where her father Fred was club professional at Bootle Golf Club. She faced discrimination from golf administrators because of his working class occupation. In 1955 she married Roy Smith, a Scottish Airlines pilot killed in a 1957 crash in Libya. They had one daughter. Stephens curtailed her playing career to raise her daughter, but subsequently was active in golf administration and developing junior golf. She was made OBE for "services to Ladies Golf" in the 1977 New Year Honours, a year before her death from cancer.

Golf career
Stephens' home club was Royal Birkdale. She won the British Ladies Amateur in 1949 and 1954, and was runner-up in 1951 and 1952. She played in all six Curtis Cups from 1950 to 1960, and was non-playing captain of the Great Britain and Ireland team in 1962 and 1972. Her final-hole victories over Polly Riley in the 1956 and 1958 tournaments secured a win and a draw respectively for the British team, the first time it retained the cup. In the United States she was "hardly known", though she finished tied for 6th in the 1949 U.S. Women's Open. She was also a non-playing captain of the British team in the Vagliano Trophy.

Herbert Warren Wind called her a "slight, quiet, entirely undramatic girl" and an outstanding clutch player. Enid Wilson said she had "a very frail physique but ... the temperament of a tigress". Her swing had a pronounced hiatus at the top, which Wind called "most unimpressive", although Henry Cotton said she had "one of the prettiest swings in the game".

Team appearances
Curtis Cup (representing Great Britain & Ireland): 1950, 1952 (winners), 1954, 1956 (winners), 1958 (winners), 1960, 1962 (non-playing captain), 1972 (non-playing captain)
Vagliano Trophy (representing Great Britain & Ireland): 1947 (winners), 1948 (winners), 1949 (winners), 1953 (winners), 1955 (winners), 1959 (winners), 1971 (non-playing captain, winners)
Commonwealth Trophy (representing Great Britain): 1959 (winners), 1963 (winners)

References

English female golfers
Amateur golfers
Officers of the Order of the British Empire
Deaths from cancer in the United Kingdom
Sportspeople from Lancashire
1924 births
1978 deaths